This is a list of sugars and sugar products. Sugar is the generalized name for sweet, short-chain, soluble carbohydrates, many of which are used in food. They are composed of carbon, hydrogen, and oxygen. There are various types of sugar derived from different sources.

Generally speaking, chemical names ending in -ose indicate sugars. "Syrup" indicates a sugary solution. 

Malting is a way of processing starchy grains like wheat and barley into sugar, so "malt extract" will be mostly sugar. Sugar is mostly extracted from plants by juicing them, then drying the purified juice, so "evaporated cane juice crystals" or "concentrated grape juice" are also very similar to pure sugars.

Sugars and sugar products

 Agave syrup – very high in fructose and sweeter than honey
 Arabinose
 Barbados sugar
 Barley malt syrup, barley malt – around 65% maltose and 30% complex carbohydrate
 Barley sugar – similar to hard caramel
 Beet sugar – made from sugar beets, contains a high concentration of sucrose
 Birch syrup – around 42-54% fructose, 45% glucose, plus a small amount of sucrose
 Brown sugar – Consists of a minimum 88% sucrose and invert sugar. Commercial brown sugar contains from 4.5% molasses (light brown sugar) to 6.5% molasses (dark brown sugar) based on total volume. Based on total weight, regular commercial brown sugar contains up to 10% molasses.
 Buttered syrup
 Cane sugar (cane juice, cane juice crystals), contains a high concentration of sucrose.
 Caramel – made of a variety of sugars
 Carob syrup – made from carob pods
 Caster sugar
 Coconut sugar – 70-79% sucrose and 3-9% glucose and fructose
 Confectioner's sugar (also known as "icing sugar")
 Corn sugar – dextrose produced from corn starch
Corn syrup – sweet syrup produced from corn starch that may contain glucose, maltose and other sugars.
 Date sugar
 Dehydrated cane juice
 Demerara sugar
 Dextrin – an incompletely hydrolyzed starch made from a variety of grains or other starchy foods.
 Dextrose – same as glucose, dextrose is an alternative name of glucose
 Disaccharide – also known as double sugar, it is made when two monosaccharides (aka simple sugars) are joined together. Examples include sucrose, lactose, and maltose.
 Evaporated cane juice
 Free sugar – all monosaccharides and disaccharides added to food and naturally present sugars in honey, syrups, and fruit juices (sugars inside cells, as in raw fruit, are not included)
 Fructose – a simple ketonic monosaccharide found in many plants, where it is often bonded to glucose to form the disaccharide sucrose
 Fruit juice, Fruit juice concentrate
 Fucose
 Galactose – a monosaccharide sugar not as sweet as glucose or fructose
 Glucose, glucose solids
 Golden syrup, golden sugar – refined sugar cane or sugar beet juice
 Grape sugar, grape juice
 High fructose corn syrup (HFCS) – made from corn starch, containing from 55% fructose to 90% fructose. 
 High maltose corn syrup – mainly maltose, not as sweet as high fructose corn syrup
 Honey – consists of fructose and glucose
 Inositol – naturally occurring sugar alcohol.  Commercial products are purified from corn.
 Inverted sugar syrup – Pursuant to Code of Federal Regulation 21CFR184.1859, invert sugar is an "aqueous solution of inverted or partly inverted, refined or partly refined sucrose, the solids of which contain not more than 0.3 percent by weight of ash. The solution is colorless, odorless, and flavorless, except for sweetness. It is produced by the hydrolysis or partial hydrolysis of sucrose with safe and suitable acids or enzymes." 
 Jaggery – made from date, cane juice, or palm sap, contains 50% sucrose, up to 20% invert sugars, and a maximum of 20% moisture
 Lactose – sometimes called milk sugar 
 Malt extract or malt syrup -– a sweet, sticky, brown liquid made from barley 
 Maltose – a disaccharide formed from two units of glucose joined with an α(1→4) bond, formed from a condensation reaction
 Maltodextrin, maltol – a white powder or concentrated liquid made from corn starch, potato starch, or rice starch.  Although it is sugar polymer, it does not taste sweet.
 Mannose
 Maple sugar – around 90% sucrose
 Maple syrup – around 90% sucrose
 Molasses (from sugar beets) – consists of 50% sugar by dry weight, mainly sucrose, but also contains substantial amounts of glucose and fructose
 Molasses (from sugar cane)
 Monosaccharide – refers to 'simple sugars', these are the most basic units of carbohydrates. Examples are glucose, fructose, and galactose.
 Muscovado – a minimally processed sugar
 Non-centrifugal cane sugar – made by the simple evaporation of sugar cane juice. 
 Palm sugar – made from sap tapped from the inflorescence of assorted varieties of palm
 Panela
 Penuche
 Powdered sugar
 Raw sugar
 Refiner's sugar, refiner's syrup
 Ribose
 Rice syrup
 Rhamnose
 Saccharose
 Sorghum syrup
 Sucrose – often called white sugar, granulated sugar, or table sugar, is a disaccharide chemical that naturally contains glucose and fructose. Commercial products are made from sugarcane juice or sugar beet juice.
 Sugarcane, which contains a high concentration of sucrose
Sweet sorghum
 Syrup
 Treacle – any uncrystallised syrup made during the refining of sugar
 Trehalose – a natural alpha-linked disaccharide formed by an α,α-1,1-glucoside bond between two α-glucose units.
 Yellow sugar
 Xylose

See also
 List of syrups

References

External links
 

Carbohydrates
Sugars